Dumka Assembly constituency   is an assembly constituency in  the Indian state of Jharkhand.

Overview
Dumka Assembly constituency covers: Dumka Town, Dumka Muffassil and Masalia Police Stations in Dumka district.

This seat is reserved for Scheduled Tribes.

Dumka Assembly constituency is part of Dumka (Lok Sabha constituency).

Members of Legislative Assembly

Election results

2020 by elections

2019

2014

See also
Dumka (community development block)
Masalia
Jharkhand Legislative Assembly
List of states of India by type of legislature

References

Assembly constituencies of Jharkhand
Dumka district